Alessandro Nini (born in Fano near Pesaro, 1 November 1805 – died in Bergamo, 27 December 1880) was an Italian composer of operas and church music, also chamber music and symphonies. Of the eight operas he composed, La marescialla d'Ancre is considered his best work. He also contributed to a portion of Messa per Rossini. Specifically the fifth section of II. Sequentia, Ingemisco for solo tenor and chorus.

Operas
Ida della torre (11 November 1837, Venice)
La marescialla d'Ancre (23 July 1839, Padua)
Cristina di Svezia (6 June 1840, Genoa)
Margherita d'Yorck (21 March 1841, Venice)
Odalisa (19 February 1842, Milan)
Virginia (21 February 1842, Genoa)
La marescialla d'Ancre [rev] (1 May 1847, Milan)
Il corsaro (25 September 1847 Turin)

1805 births
1880 deaths
Italian classical composers
Italian male classical composers
Italian opera composers
Male opera composers
Classical composers of church music
People from the Province of Pesaro and Urbino
19th-century classical composers
19th-century Italian composers
19th-century Italian male musicians